Dilek Esmer (born 15 January 1988) is a retired Turkish discus thrower. She tested positive for doping, and was suspended from competing between June 2013 and December 2015.

Biography
She finished eighth at the 2005 World Youth Championships. She also competed at the 2009 European U23 Championships and the 2012 European Championships without reaching the final.

Esmer became Turkish champion three times. At the 2013 Turkish championships, she tested positive for doping, and was suspended between June 2013 and December 2015.

Her personal best throw was 57.56 metres, achieved in March 2012 in Mersin.

References

1988 births
Living people
Turkish female discus throwers
Doping cases in athletics
Turkish sportspeople in doping cases